"Dançando Lambada" is a song by French-Brazilian group Kaoma with the Brazilian vocalist Loalwa Braz. It was the second single from Kaoma's debut album Worldbeat and followed the smash worldwide hit "Lambada". Released in October 1989, it achieved success, peaking at #4 in France, #6 in Switzerland and #11 in Ireland, but was unable to duplicate the success of the band's previous hit single. A dub version of "Lambada" was available on the 12" and CD maxi.

Track listings
 3" single
 "Dançando Lambada" (single version) — 3:48
 "Dançando Lambada" (version maxi) — 4:44
 "Lamba Caribe" — 3:36

 7" single
 "Dançando Lambada" — 3:48
 "Lamba caribe" — 3:35

 12" maxi
 "Dançando Lambada" — 4:45
 "Lamba caribe" — 5:29

 12" maxi
 "Dancando Lambada" (LP version) — 4:44
 "Lambada" (dub mix) — 4:25
 "Lamba Caribe" (extended version) — 5:29

 CD maxi
 "Dancando Lambada" (single version) — 3:50
 "Dancando Lambada" (version maxi) — 4:46
 "Lamba Caribe" (extended version) — 5:31
 "Lambada" (dub mix) — 4:28

Charts and sales

Peak positions

Year-end charts

Certifications

References

1989 singles
Kaoma songs
1989 songs
Columbia Records singles